WPLA (104.9 MHz, "104.9 Lake FM") is an FM radio station broadcasting a classic hits format, having switched over from Christmas music on December 27, 2020, and before that from classic country in November 2020. Licensed to LaFollette, Tennessee, United States, the station is owned by Loud Media LLC.

History
WPLA was initially licensed as WQLA on June 13, 1985. It changed its callsign to WQLA-FM on November 1, 1991, and to WTNQ on May 16, 2008.

On May 27, 2020, it was announced the station was to be acquired by Loud Media. On June 26, 2020, Loud Media took over the signal, which began stunting playing '60s-'80s music with a pending launch of a new format.

At midnight on June 29, 2020, the station launched as classic country station "Q104.9" with the tag line "Tennessee’s Throwback Country".

The sale to Loud Media was consummated on November 20, 2020. On November 22, 2020, WTNQ dropped its classic country format and began stunting with Christmas music, branded as "Santa 104.9".

At 1 p.m. on December 27, 2020, WTNQ became 104.9 Lake FM with the slogan 'Knoxville's Greatest Hits' playing a classic hits format. Loud Media has previously used its Lake FM format and branding in other radio markets located in Upstate New York. On July 13, 2021, the station adopted the call sign WPLA to match the format.

Previous logo

References

External links

PLA
Campbell County, Tennessee
Classic hits radio stations in the United States
Radio stations established in 1985
1985 establishments in Tennessee